Mohamad Sukri Abdul Mutalib (born 24 February 1986) is a Malaysian field hockey player.

Sukri has been playing in the MHL since 2005 where he represented Bank Simpanan Nasional before moving to Ernst & Young the following year. He stuck with KLHC, who are in fact a continuation of E&Y.

Prior to the MHL, Sukri played for Bandar Penawar Sports School in the Junior Hockey League from 1999 to 2001 after which the sports schools combined and played in the MJHL as a team from 2002 to 2004.

It was during the MJHL that his talent was spotted by former national coach Paul Lissek and Sukri was drafted into the national training squad when he was only 16.

He made his international debut in 2003 against China in a test match played at the Tun Razak Stadium, at 17 years old, making him one of the youngest players to don national senior colours.

In June 2011, Sukri started his overseas career along with another Malaysian Faizal Saari. They were selected by the Southern Hotshots team for the Australian Hockey League.

References

External links

1986 births
Living people
Malaysian people of Malay descent
People from Perak
Malaysian male field hockey players
Asian Games medalists in field hockey
Field hockey players at the 2006 Asian Games
Field hockey players at the 2010 Asian Games
Field hockey players at the 2014 Asian Games
2014 Men's Hockey World Cup players
Field hockey players at the 2018 Asian Games
2018 Men's Hockey World Cup players
Asian Games silver medalists for Malaysia
Medalists at the 2010 Asian Games
Medalists at the 2018 Asian Games
Male field hockey midfielders
Expatriate field hockey players
Malaysian expatriates in Australia
Southeast Asian Games gold medalists for Malaysia
Southeast Asian Games medalists in field hockey
Competitors at the 2017 Southeast Asian Games